Cyanoramphus is a genus of parakeets native to New Zealand and islands of the southern Pacific Ocean. The New Zealand forms are often referred to as kākāriki. They are small to medium-sized parakeets with long tails and predominantly green plumage. Most species are forest species, although several of the subantarctic species live in open grassland. Despite many fossil birds being found in the islands between these two areas being found none of these were of undescribed Cyanoramphus species.

Like many other species of birds the Cyanoramphus parakeets have suffered from changes brought about by humans. The two species from the Society Islands, the black-fronted parakeet and the Society parakeet, have become extinct as have the subspecies from Lord Howe Island and Macquarie Island, as well as an undescribed form from Campbell Island. One species, the Malherbe's parakeet (C. malherbi), is critically endangered while most other species are endangered or vulnerable. Habitat loss and introduced species are considered responsible for the declines and extinctions.

The genus Cyanoramphus was introduced in 1854 by the French ornithologist Charles Lucien Bonaparte. The genus name combines the Ancient Greek kuanos meaning "dark-blue" and rhamphos meaning "bill". The type species was designated by English zoologist George Robert Gray in 1855 as what is now the extinct black-fronted parakeet (Cyanoramphus zealandicus).

Species

There are 12 recognised species, of which 4 are extinct:
 † Black-fronted parakeet (C. zealandicus)
 † Raiatea parakeet (C. ulietanus)
 New Caledonian parakeet (C. saisseti)
 Chatham parakeet (C. forbesi) formerly considered a subspecies of C. auriceps
 Norfolk parakeet (C. cookii)
 † Lord Howe parakeet (C. subflavescens)
 Antipodes parakeet (C. unicolor)
 Yellow-crowned parakeet (C. auriceps)
 Malherbe's parakeet (C. malherbi) formerly considered a subspecies of C. auriceps
 Red-crowned parakeet (C. novaezelandiae)
 Reischek's parakeet (C. hochstetteri) formerly considered a subspecies of C. novaezelandiae
 † Macquarie parakeet (C. erythrotis)

The two forms of C. erythrotis are usually considered to be distinct species: the single specimen believed to be from Macquarie Island (Canterbury Museum specimen AV2099, O'Connor catalog 369) in Boon et al.'''s analysis has turned out to be from the Antipodes Islands population (hochstetteri) instead. In addition there are subfossil remains from a yet undescribed extinct Cyanoramphus'' species from Campbell Island.

References

External links

 
Parrots
Bird genera
Taxa named by Charles Lucien Bonaparte